The 53rd Sikhs (Frontier Force) was an infantry regiment of the British Indian Army. It was raised in 1847 as the 3rd Regiment of Infantry The Frontier Brigade. It was designated as the 53rd Sikhs (Frontier Force) in 1903 and became 3rd Battalion (Sikhs) 12th Frontier Force Regiment in 1922. In 1947, it was allocated to the Pakistan Army, where it continues to exist as 5th Battalion The Frontier Force Regiment.

Early history
The regiment was raised on 1 January 1847 at Ferozepur as the 3rd Regiment of Infantry The Frontier Brigade by Captain DF Winter. It was composed of Sikhs, Punjabi Muslims, Pathans, Dogras and Hindustanis. In 1847, it was designated 3rd Regiment of Sikh Local Infantry, becoming the 3rd Regiment of Sikh Infantry in 1857. In 1851, it became part of the Punjab Irregular Force, which later became famous as the Punjab Frontier Force or The Piffers. The Piffers consisted of five regiments of cavalry, eleven regiments of infantry and five batteries of artillery besides the Corps of Guides. Their mission was to maintain order on the Punjab Frontier; a task they performed with great aplomb. On the outbreak of the Indian Mutiny in 1857, the Hindustani Company was disbanded. In 1858 the 3rd Sikh Infantry took part in mopping up operations in North India. During the Second Afghan War of 1878-80, the regiment took part in the defence of Sherpur Cantonment and the Battle of Kandahar, while in 1897, it served in the Tirah Campaign.

53rd Sikhs (Frontier Force)
Subsequent to the reforms brought about in the Indian Army by Lord Kitchener in 1903, the regiment's designation was changed to 53rd Sikhs (Frontier Force). In 1914, the regiment's class composition was four companies of Sikhs, two of Pathans, and one each of Punjabi Muslims and Dogras. During the First World War, the regiment served throughout with the 28th Indian Brigade. In 1915, it served in Egypt and Aden (Yemen), moving to Mesopotamia in December. Here, it fought with great gallantry in the bloody battles for the Relief of Kut al Amara on the Tigris Front in 1916-17, the capture of Baghdad and in operations north of Baghdad at Istabulat, Daur and Tikrit. In 1918, the regiment moved to Palestine and took part in the Battle of Megiddo, which led to the annihilation of Turkish Army in Palestine. It returned to India in 1920.

Subsequent history
After the First World War, the 53rd Sikhs were grouped with the 51st, 52nd and 54th Sikhs, and the two battalions of Guides Infantry to form the 12th Frontier Force Regiment in 1922. The 53rd Sikhs became 3rd Battalion (Sikhs) of the new regiment. For their excellent performance during the First World War, they were made a 'Royal' battalion in 1935. During the Second World War, 3/12 FF served with great distinction in the Italian East Africa, Sicily, Italy and Greece. In 1947, the Frontier Force Regiment was allotted to the Pakistan Army. In 1948, 3/12 FF fought in the Kashmir War against India. In 1956, the Frontier Force Rifles and the Pathan Regiment were merged with the Frontier Force Regiment, and 3/12 FF was redesignated as 5 FF. During the Indo-Pakistan War of 1965, the battalion greatly distinguished itself in the Battle of Khem Karan, while during the Indo-Pakistan War of 1971 it served in Kashmir. The unit was awarded 5 Sitara-e-Jurrats and 4 Tamgha-e-Jurrats during its post-independence service

Lineage

1846: 3rd Regiment of Infantry The Frontier Brigade 
1847: 3rd Regiment of Sikh Local Infantry
1857: 3rd Regiment of Sikh Infantry
1857: 3rd Regiment of Sikh Infantry, Punjab Irregular Force
1865: 3rd Regiment of Sikh Infantry, Punjab Frontier Force
1901: 3rd Sikh Infantry
1903: 53rd Sikhs (Frontier Force)
1922: 3rd Battalion (Sikhs) 12th Frontier Force Regiment
1935: 3rd Royal Battalion (Sikhs) 12th Frontier Force Regiment
1945: 3rd Royal Battalion (Sikhs) The Frontier Force Regiment
1947: 3rd Royal Battalion The Frontier Force Regiment
1956: 5th Battalion The Frontier Force Regiment

See also
The Frontier Force Regiment
12th Frontier Force Regiment
Punjab Irregular Force

References

Further reading
 Shepherd, Lt Col CI. (1931). Historical Records of the 3rd Sikhs 1847-1930. Bournemouth: Pardy and Son.
 The Historical Record of the 3rd Sikh Infantry. (1887).
 The Historical Record of the 3rd Sikh Infantry, Punjab Frontier Force. (1904).
 Khan, M Nawaz. (1969). History of 5th Battalion The Frontier Force Regiment (1847-1969).
 Condon, Brig WEH. (1962). The Frontier Force Regiment, Aldershot: Gale & Polden Ltd.
 North, REFG. (1934). The Punjab Frontier Force: A Brief Record of Their Services 1846-1924. DI Khan: Commercial Steam Press.
 Jafar Ali Khan, Maj Gen M. (1950). One Hundred Glorious Years: A History of the Punjab Frontier Force, 1849-1949. Lahore: Civil and Military Gazette Press.
 Dey, RSBN. (1905). A Brief Account of the Late Punjab Frontier Force, From its Organization in 1849 to its Re-distribution on 31st March 1903. Calcutta. 
 Attiqur Rahman, Lt Gen M. (1980). The Wardens of the Marches – A History of the Piffers 1947-71. Lahore: Wajidalis.
 Khan, Maj Muhammad Nawaz. (1996). The Glorious Piffers 1843-1995. Abbottabad: The Frontier Force Regimental Centre. 
 Gaylor, John. (1991). Sons of John Company: The Indian and Pakistan Armies 1903- 1991. Stroud: Spellmount. 
Barthorp, M, and Burn, J. (1979). Indian Infantry Regiments 1860-1914. London: Osprey. 
Sumner, Ian. (2001). The Indian Army 1914-1947. London: Osprey. 

British Indian Army infantry regiments
Frontier Force Regiment
Military units and formations established in 1846
1846 establishments in British India